On November 2, 2002, the District of Columbia held an election for its non-voting House delegate representing the District of Columbia's at-large congressional district. The winner of the race was incumbent Eleanor Holmes Norton (D).

The delegate is elected for two-year terms.

Candidates 
Incumbent Del. Eleanor Holmes Norton, a Democrat, sought re-election for a 7th full term to the United States House of Representatives. Norton was opposed in this election by independent challenger Pat Kidd who received 6.03%, resulting in Norton being re-elected with 93.01% of the vote.

Results

See also
 United States House of Representatives elections in the District of Columbia

References 

United States House
District of Columbia
2002